"In a Mist" is a 1927 composition for piano by Bix Beiderbecke.

Background
"In a Mist" was first recorded by Beiderbecke as a piano solo on September 9, 1927 in New York and released as OKeh 40916 backed with "Wringin' an' Twistin'" which was recorded with Frankie Trumbauer and Eddie Lang.

Bix Beiderbecke performed the composition on piano accompanied by Roy Bargy and Lennie Hayton at Carnegie Hall on October 7, 1928 at a jazz concert presented by Paul Whiteman.

Style
"In a Mist" mixes elements of late impressionism with early jazz. While written in C-major, the piece is heavily chromatic. Bix mostly plays on the fourth and fifth, often inserting sharp or flat accidentals, while avoiding the tonic to increase tension. Harmonically, the piece features melancholic, rich chords; the swing tempo gives the piece a zippy, joyful quality. These tensions drive the piece, finally settling on a hopeful C-major.

Cover versions

 Red Norvo, on marimba, 1933.
 Frankie Trumbauer, 1934, including Charlie and Jack Teagarden, Roy Bargy, and Dick McDonough and released as Brunswick 6997.
 Lilian Crawford, 1934, released as Champion 16817.
 Manuel Salsamendi, 1935, recorded on Argentinian Odeon.
 Benny Goodman, 1936 radio broadcast.
 Jess Stacy, recorded from a Benny Goodman Camel Caravan broadcast.
 Bunny Berigan and His Men, 1938
 Larry Clinton, 1938
 Alix Combelle, 1941
 Mel Henke with the Honeydreamers, 1947, as Vitacoustic U-669
 Jimmy McPartland, 1949, with Marian McPartland on piano.
 Harry James, 1950 on Columbia 38902.
 Sal Franzella
 Ralph Sutton, 1950 on Commodore.
 Jess Stacy, 1950 on Columbia.
 The Les Jowett Seven, 1957
 Red Nichols, 1953
 Dill Jones, 1955, the first British recording
 Jimmy McPartland, 1956
 Tom Talbert, 1956
 Sauter-Finegan Orchestra in an arrangement by Eddie Sauter
 Les Jowett, 1957
 Manny Albam, 1958, with Art Farmer, Donald Byrd, Ernie Royal, Bob Brookmeyer, Jerome Richardson, Zoot Sims, Al Cohn, Pepper Adams, Milt Hinton, Osie Johnson, and Eddie Costal.
 Lou Busch, 1958
 Michel Legrand, 1958
 Dick Cathcart, 1959
 The Metropolitan Jazz Octet, 1959
 Johnny Guarnieri, 1961
 Lew Davies, 1962
 Ralph Sutton, 1963
 Clark Terry, 1964
 Armand Hug, 1968, released on Dulai.
 Len Bernard, 1968 on Swaggie.
 Ralph Sutton, 1969
 Dill Jones, 1972, on the Chiaroscuro album Davenport Blues.
 Jack Crossan, 1972
 Freddie Hubbard, 1972
 Bucky Pizzarelli, arranged for guitar, 1974
 Geoff Bland, 1974
 Dick Hyman, 1974
 Swingle Singers, 1975
 Trace, 1975
 Keith Nichols, 1975
 Armand Hug, 1976
 Dave Frishberg, 1977
 Kenny Werner, 1978
 Ry Cooder, 1978
 Vintage Jazz Band, 1978
 Eddie Higgins, 1978

 Charlie Byrd, in a guitar duet with Laurindo Almeida, 1980.
 Franca Mazzola, 1981, released on Carosello.
 Bucky Pizzarelli, with son John, Jr., 1984
 Lou Stein, 1984
 Bob Haggart, 1986
 Marco Fumo, 1987
 Saint Louis Stompers, released in 1988 in Argentina.
 Joe LoCascio, 1988
 Morten Gunnar Larsen, 1989
 Protosynthesis Ensemble, 1990
 Cesare Poggi, 1991
 Bix movie soundtrack, 1991
 Eddie Daniels with Gary Burton, 1992
 Butch Thompson, 1992
 Eddie Daniels, 1992

 Mike Polad, 1993
 Guy Barker, 1993
 Charlie Byrd and the Washington Guitar Quintet, 1993
 Ralph Sutton, 1993
 Randy Sandke and the New York Allstars, 1993
 Sven-Eric Dahlberg, 1994
 Jess Stacy, 1995
 Roy Eldridge, 1995
 Lincoln Mayorga, 1995
 Eddie Higgins, 1995
 Beau Hunks, 1996
 Robert Smith, 1997
 Joseph Smith, 1998
 Duncan Browne, 1998
 London Symphony Orchestra, 1998
 Charlie Byrd, 1998
 Dick Walter, 1998
 Dean Cotrill, 2000
 Andy Bey, 2001
 Bucky Pizzarelli, 2001
 Mark Atkinson, 2002
 Dick Hyman, 2002
 Geoff Muldaur, 2003
 Vasari Singers, 2003
 Bratislava Serenaders, 2003
 Claude Bolling, 2004
 Philip Aaberg, 2004
 Scott Whitfield Jazz Orchestra East, 2004
 Heinz von Hermann, 2004
 Jim Martinez, 2004
 Westwind Brass, 2005
 Patrick Artero, 2006
 Don Baaska, 2007
 Wolfgang Kohler, 2007
 Brent Watkins, 2007
 Richard Dowling, Rhapsody in Ragtime, 2007
 Ken Mathieson, arranged for two brasses, three reeds and three rhythms, Ken Mathieson's Classic Jazz Orchestra Salutes the Kings of Jazz, 2008
 Bryan Wright, Rivermont Records, 2010
 Bucky Pizzarelli, 2012	
 Claudio Cojaniz, 2014
 Juliet Kurtzman and Pete Malinverni, Candlelight: Love in the Time of Cholera

References

 Bix: Man and Legend by Richard M. Sudhalter & Philip R. Evens, Quartet, 1974.
 Bix: The Definitive Biography of a Jazz Legend by Jean Pierre Lion with the assistance of Gabriella Page-Fort, Michael B. Heckman and Norman Field, Continuum Publishers, New York/London, 2004.
 Remembering Bix by Ralph Berton, Harper & Row, 1974.
 Bix Beiderbecke by Burnett James, Cassell & Co, Ltd., 1959.
 "Our Language." Episode 3, Jazz (television miniseries) by Ken Burns, PBS Home Video/Warner Home Video, 2001.
 Leon "Bix" Beiderbecke. Red Hot Jazz.com.
 Pops: Paul Whiteman, King of Jazz by Thomas A. DeLong, New Century Publishers, 1983,

External links
 

1927 songs
Instrumentals
1920s jazz standards